Life Express is a 2010 Indian drama film about a career-minded woman who decides to become a mother through surrogacy after having an abortion.

Plot 
Mumbai-based Tanvi Sharma, married to financier, Nikhil, for 3 years, is thrilled when she is not only promoted as Assistant Vice-President with her employer, ICBI Bank, but also tests positive for motherhood. Her joy surrounding her pregnancy is short-lived when she realizes that motherhood will not only negatively impact her marriage but her promotion as well. After her abortion, she and Nikhil decide to have a child through a surrogate, who will live with them during the pregnancy period. A broker, Shukla, arranges a surrogate, Gauri, an impoverished village-based mother of two children, and the wife of an unemployed idol-artist, Mohan. While dealing with pressures of the stigma attached of nursing a child sired through another woman from family and friends, she must also deal with the fact that a naive Gauri may decide to keep the child.

Cast
Rituparna Sengupta as Tanvi N. Sharma
Kiran Janjani as Nikhil Sharma
Yashpal Sharma as Mohan
Alok Nath as Mr. Singh - Tanvi's dad
Nandita Puri as Mrs. Shanti Singh - Tanvi's mom
Anjan Srivastav as Paresh
Daya Shankar Pandey as Shukla
Vijayendra Ghatge as Tanvi's boss
Divya Dutta as Gauri
Sapan Saran as Soni

Soundtrack

Roop Kumar Rathod was the music director. Shakeel Azmi wrote the lyrics. The album has 8 tracks.

References

External links 
 

2010 films
2010s Hindi-language films
Indian pregnancy films
Films scored by Roop Kumar Rathod